North American Youth Congress (or NAYC) is a biennial event held by the Youth Ministries division of the United Pentecostal Church International, occurring every other year since 1979. The event has been described as one of the largest gathering of Christian youth in the U.S. and is held in different cities around the country each year. For the most recent in-person meeting in 2019, there was a record attendance of over 36,000 youth and young adults.

Overview
NAYC is the "premier youth conference" of the United Pentecostal Church International and is intended mainly for youth and young adults, aimed at students ages 12 to 25. At the event, students attend various breakout session and nightly services, as well as participate in networking, fellowship, and community service over the course of three days. Additionally, attendees participate in a program known as "Serve Day" (formerly Project 22:39) where students help serve the nearby communities.

History
NAYC was launched in 1979 and has traveled to various cities around the U.S. every year, starting in Memphis, TN., with the most recent being in St. Louis, MO. The event has grown over recent years, with the 2019 edition being described by multiple outlets as "one of the largest Christian youth events in the country."

2015
In 2015, NAYC was held at Chesapeake Energy Arena in Oklahoma City, OK. The event drew over 22,000 young people and was the first to be sold out in NAYC history. Overflow seating was provided in the neighboring Cox Convention Center.

2017

NAYC 2017 was held at Lucas Oil Stadium in Indianapolis, IN. This was the first year that NAYC had been held in a football stadium, and the event was attended by over 34,000 youth and young adults.

2019
Held at the Dome at America's Center in St. Louis, MO, NAYC 2019 was the largest to date, with around 37,000 young people attending. During the event's "Serve Day," attendees filled 2,000 buckets worth $75 each to assist with disaster relief in the area.

2021
In 2021, NAYC was once again scheduled to be held at Lucas Oil Stadium in Indianapolis, IN but was canceled as an in-person event due to the COVID-19 pandemic.

2023
NAYC 2023 is scheduled to be held from July 26 to July 28, 2023, in St. Louis, MO at The Dome at America's Center with split sessions at the St. Louis Convention Center.

See also
 United Pentecostal Church International
 Oneness Pentecostalism

References

Christian conferences
Recurring events established in 1979
1979 establishments in the United States